Coleytown is a census-designated place (CDP) in the town of Westport, Fairfield County, Connecticut, United States. It occupies the northeast corner of the town and is bordered to the north by the town of Weston and to the east by the town of Fairfield.

Coleytown was first listed as a CDP prior to the 2020 census.

References 

Census-designated places in Fairfield County, Connecticut
Census-designated places in Connecticut